Emigration from Colombia is a migratory phenomenon that started in the early 20th century.

Overview
Immigration from Colombia was determined mostly by security issues linked mainly to the Colombian armed conflict.  From 1980-2000, emigration from Colombia was one of the largest in volume in Hispanic America. According to the 2005 Colombian census or DANE, about 3,331,107 Colombian citizens currently permanently reside outside of Colombia. Other estimates, however, suggest that the actual number could exceed 4 million, or almost 10 percent of the country's population. Approximately 1.2 million Colombians are believed to have left the country during 2000–5 and not returned.

In 2005, the population movement towards North America and Europe in particular has been motivated in some cases by the threat of violence but more typically by the search for greater economic opportunity.  Due to the current sociopolitical situation in Colombia, emigration affects Colombians of all social standings and geographic zones.  The highest rates of emigration have been registered in the main urban centers of the interior zone of the country: Bogotá, Medellín, Cali, Bucaramanga, Pereira, Manizales, and Cúcuta.

Destinations
Until 2002, external migration was primarily to the United States, Venezuela, Spain and Ecuador. As of 2003, the estimated Colombian population in those countries was 2,020,000, 1,340,000, 240,000, and 193,000, respectively. Panama, Italy, the Netherlands, Germany and the United Kingdom also have significant (>20,000) populations of Colombian emigrants. In 2003, North America was the destination for 48 percent of Colombian emigrants; Hispanic America and the Caribbean, 40 percent; Europe, 11 percent; and Asia, Oceania, and Africa, 1 percent.

The Colombian diaspora refers to the mass movement of Colombian people who emigrated from the country in search of safety, better quality of life and/or get away from government corruption. Many of those who moved were educated middle and upper middle-class Colombians; because of this, the Colombian diaspora can be referred to as a brain drain. Colombian officials state that this movement peaked in the year 2000 and that the most popular destinations for emigration include North America and Europe. In Europe, Spain has the largest Colombian community on the continent, followed by Italy and the United Kingdom. Many Colombians are also dispersed throughout the rest of Hispanic America. Mexico, Costa Rica, Peru and Chile received political refugees in the mid-to-late 20th century, and Colombian guest workers in the early 2000s. The Colombian diaspora can also refer to the large wave of Colombian artists who migrated seeking better opportunities and new, more lucrative markets.

Colombian restaurants and bakeries are important institutions for the Colombian diaspora.  These eateries have popularized formerly regional dishes like the well-portioned Bandeja paisa, Ajiaco among Colombians from all parts of the country.

Top Colombian diaspora populations 
Regions with significant populations

Social and economic impact
Colombians living abroad—1.5  million of whom departed during the economic downturn between 1996 and 2002—have had a positive effect on the balance of payments thanks to remittances to family and friends at home. According to Colombian newspaper El Tiempo, the value of remittances from Colombians living abroad is ranked third as the main source of foreign money in Colombia and has already surpassed the value of coffee exports.

But external migration to the United States or Europe has represented a definite loss of talent and energy because migrants to the developed world tend to be better educated and in the prime of working life. Some estimates would have roughly half the physicians trained in Colombia during certain years, at great expense to fellow Colombian taxpayers, now working in the United States. Then, too, there are communities (as in Mexico, for example) that have been so drained of young workers that they find themselves dependent on the flow of remittances. Several municipalities in the vicinity of Pereira in western Colombia, hard hit by troubles in the coffee industry and the competition of cheap Asian labor in garment exporting, exemplify the latter phenomenon.

Human trafficking
The Colombian government has developed prevention programs against illegal groups that offer emigration help to unsuspecting people, many of whom are eventually forced into slavery, forced prostitution and human trafficking in foreign countries.

See also

Demographics of Colombia
Foreign relations of Colombia
Immigration to Colombia
Colombian people
Venezuelan refugee crisis

References

Demographics of Colombia
Colombia